The 2001 Australian V8 Ultimate was the thirteenth and final round of the 2001 Shell Championship Series. It was held on the weekend of 1 to 2 December at the Sandown International Raceway in Melbourne, Victoria.

Race report 

Todd Kelly took his first round win in a race weekend mainly composed of heavy rain.

Race results

Qualifying

Top Fifteen Shootout

Race 1

Race 2

Race 3

Championship Standings

References

Sandown
Motorsport at Sandown